Comte Michel de Pierredon is a papal title held by the French family Michel de Pierredon. Comte is a title of French nobility roughly equivalent to the English language title "count". Other holders of the title include:
Marius Michel Pasha

French titles of nobility
Nobles of the Holy See